Instant Karma is a 1990 romantic drama film directed by Roderick Taylor. The film stars as Craig Sheffer as Zane, a TV producer looking for romance.

Plot
Zane (Craig Sheffer) is writer-producer of the TV show "Rock & Roll P.I." Although a successful young man, he is lonely and having a particularly bad week. He has a confrontation with the show's temperamental star, Reno (David Cassidy), on the set of the show. Zane and his co-writer David (Glenn Hirsch) are pitching a script to producer Jon Clark (Marty Ingels). By the end of the meeting, Jon says he loves the story, but wants to change the script completely. Zane's accountant tells him that the Internal Revenue Service is planning to perform an audit of his investments. Zane also has an encounter with an actress, Penelope (Chelsea Noble).

Zane begins dating Penelope and things go smoothly. Then one afternoon while on the set, Reno gives Zane drugs, claiming that they are harmless pills which will relax him. Later that evening, Zane takes them while on a date with Penelope and begins acting strange. Zane wakes up the next morning to discover that the pills were hallucinogens and that he only imagined most of the evening's events. He immediately calls Penelope's place, and a man answers the phone. Jumping to conclusions, Zane goes to see Penelope and becomes upset. Back at his accountant's office later that day, Zane is told he owes half a million dollars in back taxes. He is also informed that Reno has been arrested for drug abuse and that the show is being cancelled. On his way home, Zane is in a near-fatal car accident. Accompanied by his faithful basset hound Wolfgang, he walks all the way to Penelope's home and declares his love for her.

Cast
 Craig Sheffer as Zane Smith
 Chelsea Noble as Penelope Powell
 David Cassidy as Reno
 Glenn Hirsch as David
 Orson Bean as Dr. Berlin
 James Gallery as Jerry
 Alan Blumenfeld as Oscar Meyer
 William Smith as William "Pop" Dean
 Doug Steindorff as Stoned Husband
 Gail Villegas as Dancer
 Amy Lee Waddell as Julie
 Kristina Wotkyns as Cindy
 John Lacy as Lucius
 Rebekka Armstrong as Jamie
 Dan Lee Clark as Steve Elias
 Gary Burden as Jesus Man
 Brigitte Burdine as Dancer
 Sarah Buxton as Cathy
 Keri Jo Chapman as Dancer
 Gino Conforti as The Director
 Catherine M. Cummings as Shakra Zula
 Blackie Dammett as Ed Polisky
 Rick Diamond as 1st A.D.
 Steve Fuji as Boom Man
 Marty Ingels as Jon Clark
 Richard Le Pore as John Radcliff
 Sandy Newlands as Dancer
 Tiffanie Poston as Laura
 Ashley Quaine as Janet
 Larry B. Scott as Clapper Boy
 Annette Sinclair as Amy

External links 
 
 
 Instant Karma at Fandango.com

References

1990 films
Metro-Goldwyn-Mayer films
Films scored by Joel Goldsmith
Films about drugs
Films about screenwriters
Films about television people
1990s English-language films